The canton of Guise is an administrative division in northern France. At the French canton reorganisation which came into effect in March 2015, the canton was expanded from 19 to 45 communes:
 
Aisonville-et-Bernoville
Audigny
Barzy-en-Thiérache
Bergues-sur-Sambre
Bernot
Boué
Chigny
Crupilly
Dorengt
Esquéhéries
Étreux
Fesmy-le-Sart
Flavigny-le-Grand-et-Beaurain
Grand-Verly
Grougis
Guise
Hannapes
Hauteville
Iron 
Lavaqueresse
Leschelle
Lesquielles-Saint-Germain
Macquigny
Malzy
Marly-Gomont
Mennevret
Molain
Monceau-sur-Oise
La Neuville-lès-Dorengt
Le Nouvion-en-Thiérache
Noyales
Oisy
Petit-Verly
Proisy
Proix
Ribeauville
Romery
Saint-Martin-Rivière
Tupigny
Vadencourt
La Vallée-Mulâtre
Vaux-Andigny
Vénérolles
Villers-lès-Guise 
Wassigny

Demographics

See also
Cantons of the Aisne department 
Communes of France

References

Cantons of Aisne